Attorney General Boulton may refer to:

G. D'Arcy Boulton (1759–1834), Attorney-General for Upper Canada
Henry John Boulton (1790–1870), Attorney-General for Upper Canada